This is a list of airlines operating in El Salvador. Taca Airlines was the major airline and flag Carrier of El Salvador. In 2013 Taca Airlines merged with Colombian flag carrier Avianca. Comalapa International Airport is still one of Avianca's hubs connecting North America, South America, the Caribbean and parts of Europe like Spain.

See also
 List of airlines
 List of defunct airlines of El Salvador

References

Airlines
El Salvador
Airlines
El Salvador